Zhongyu may refer to:

, township of Tibet, China
Liaoning Zhongyu, former name of Liaoning Hongyun, Chinese football club
Shanxi Zhongyu, Chinese basketball club
Languages of China, collectively known as Zhongyu